Julia Y. Chan is a Professor of Chemistry and Biochemistry at Baylor University. Chan is an expert in the area of intermetallic crystal growth with a focus on new quantum materials.

Early life and education 
Chan moved to New York City at the age of eight and spent her childhood in North America. Chan studied at Baylor University and graduated in 1993. Initially a music majorspecialising in the violinshe soon became interested in chemistry. At Baylor, Chan worked under the supervision of Carlos Manzanares and Marianna Busch. She earned her doctoral degree under the supervision of Susan M. Kauzlarich at the University of California, Davis in 1998. Chan completed postdoctoral research in the ceramics division at the National Institute of Standards and Technology. She has continued to play violin in her church orchestra.

Research and career 
Chan began her career as an Assistant Professor of Chemistry at Louisiana State University in 2000. In 2002 she was awarded an National Science Foundation CAREER Award and selected as one of the American Chemical Society women making an impact in chemistry. In 2004 Chan was awarded an ExxonMobil Faculty Fellowship Award. She was part of the 2010 American Chemical Society Women Chemists of Colour Summit. She joined the Chemistry Department at University of Texas at Dallas as a Full Professor in 2013. In 2022 Chan moved to Baylor University.

At the Baylor University, Chan investigates the physical properties of magnetic materials synthesized in her laboratory, with a focus on quantum materials that contain   lanthanide cations. She has developed new techniques to grow single crystals of intermetallic phases. She was the Guest Editor of the American Chemical Society Inorganic Chemistry theme issue on Solid-State Inorganic Chemistry. In 2019 Chan was inducted into the American Association for the Advancement of Science.

Awards and honors 
Her awards and honors include:

 2003 American Crystallographic Association Margaret C. Etter Early Career Award
 2004 Alfred P. Sloan Research Fellowship
 2006 Baylor Alumni Association Outstanding Young Alum
 2008 Iota Sigma Pi Agnes Fay Morgan Research Award
 2016 University of Texas at Dallas Women Leading in Diversity Honouree
 2019 American Chemical Society Wilfred T. Doherty Award for Excellence in Chemistry
 2019 Elected Fellow of the American Association for the Advancement of Science

Selected publications 
Her publications include:

 
 
 

Chan is a Deputy Editor of Science Advances.

References 

Living people
Baylor University alumni
University of California, Davis alumni
Louisiana State University faculty
University of Texas at Dallas faculty
American women chemists
Fellows of the American Association for the Advancement of Science
Year of birth missing (living people)
 Solid state chemists
American women academics
21st-century American women scientists